The constellation Reticulum is small and faint in Earth's southern sky.

Reticulum may also refer to:

 Endoplasmic reticulum, an organelle within the cell in eukaryotic organisms
 Reticulum (anatomy), the second chamber in the alimentary canal of a ruminant animal
 Reticulum-cell sarcoma, a malignant tumor of reticular tissue that is composed primarily of neoplastic histiocytes
 Reticulum (Chinese astronomy), classified as two of 23 "Southern Asterisms" (近南極星區, Jìnnánjíxīngōu)
 Reticulum II, a dwarf galaxy rich in gold.

See also 
 Reticular (disambiguation)
 Reticulate venation
 Reticuloendothelial system